Ophelia is a moon of Uranus. It was discovered from the images taken by Voyager 2 on January 20, 1986, and was given the temporary designation S/1986 U 8. It was not seen until the Hubble Space Telescope recovered it in 2003. Ophelia was named after the daughter of Polonius, Ophelia, in William Shakespeare's play Hamlet. It is also designated Uranus VII.

Other than its orbit, radius of 21 km and geometric albedo of 0.08 virtually nothing is known about it. At the Voyager 2 images Ophelia appears as an elongated object, the major axis pointing towards Uranus. The ratio of axes of the Ophelia's prolate spheroid is 0.7 ± 0.3.

Ophelia acts as the outer shepherd satellite for Uranus' ε ring. The orbit of Ophelia is within the synchronous orbit radius of Uranus, and is therefore slowly decaying due to tidal forces.

See also 

 Moons of Uranus

References 

Explanatory notes

Citations

External links 
 Ophelia Profile by NASA's Solar System Exploration
 Uranus' Known Satellites (by Scott S. Sheppard)

19860120
Discoveries by Richard J. Terrile
Hamlet
Moons of Uranus
Things named after Shakespearean works
Moons with a prograde orbit